Massepha lupa is a moth in the family Crambidae. It was described by Herbert Druce in 1899. It is found in Honduras, Guatemala and Trinidad.

References

Moths described in 1899
Pyraustinae